Pirojsha Godrej may refer to:

 Pirojsha Burjorji Godrej (1882–1972), founder of the Godrej Group
 Pirojsha Adi Godrej, great-grandson of Pirojsha Burjorji Godrej